Dongxing (Zhuang: Dunghhingh Zen) is a town under the administration of Huanjiang Maonan Autonomous County, Guangxi, China, located in the northeast of the county. The town itself is inhabited mainly by Zhuang People speaking the Guibei dialect of Zhuang Language but there are also sizeable amounts of Yao, Miao, Maonan, Han and Sui. The town is composed of Donxing Town with its adjacent villages Banmao and Dongxing Village and it previously held a township status.

Description

Donxing Town is built on both sides of the river bank of Xiaohuangjiang river, commonly known as Zhongzhouhe, a river with great importance for the economy and agriculture of Dongxing but which faces concerning levels of pollution and flooding in the last decade. People are often seen fishing on boats or from the river bank, while during the Dragon Boat Festival, the river is a source of festive events and family gatherings.
Because the town is built on both sides of the river, it is linked by a  bridge which is due to be replaced, and connects the central road of Dongxing (X873) with Banmao.
The town features a wet market, a kindergarten and a grade school, a small public park, many street vendors for outdoor barbecue, convenience stores and hotels. Most of the town's economical output is based on logging, quarrying, retail and subsidence agriculture. On specific days of the week, farmers from nearby villages gather in Dongxing to promote and sell their produce.

Intercity transportation is available through regular coaches which stop by in Dongxing and connect with Hechi, Huanjiang and Longyanxiang.

The town experiences a declining population due in part to emigration of its youth to study, work and live in the more urban adjacent cities like Huanjiang and Hechi, while during Chinese New Year they return to celebrate with their traditional families commonly referred as "Laojia".

Gallery

See also
 Hechi, Guangxi
 Huanjiang Maonan Autonomous County

References

External links 
 Google translation of the description of Dongxing Town
 Huanjiang Maonan Autonomous County People's Government portal, Dongxing Town Government Contact Information
 广西县域经济网 >> 广西乡镇

Towns of Hechi